Maurice Dudley Hayton (born 23 April 1953) is a British former cyclist, who competed in the individual road race and team time trial events at the 1976 Summer Olympics. He currently works as a directeur sportif for UCI Continental team .

References

External links
 

1953 births
Living people
British male cyclists
Olympic cyclists of Great Britain
Cyclists at the 1976 Summer Olympics
Sportspeople from Shipley, West Yorkshire